Oystershell may refer to:

The shell of an oyster
A product made from the shell of the oyster, such as calcium supplements for humans or laying hens
Oystershell scale, a type of insect
 Oystershell NV, a technology company in over-the-counter medicinal products